Rod McGregor (born 1955) is an Australian former rugby league footballer who played as a  and  in the 1970s.

Playing career
McGregor came to St George Dragons from Yass, New South Wales, and under the new coach Harry Bath and went straight into first grade. 

He is one of very few players to win a premiership in their debut season, but he did just that as a part of the 'Bath's Babes' St George Dragons team that won the 1977 Grand Final. He was an admired tackler, and was in tons of newspapers.

He also represented New South Wales against Great Britain in 1977. The club did not perform well in 1978, and Rod McGregor decided to join South Sydney for 1979. He retired at the end of that season. He now has four children and ten grandchildren.

References

St. George Dragons players
South Sydney Rabbitohs players
New South Wales rugby league team players
Living people
1955 births
Rugby league five-eighths
Rugby league halfbacks
Date of birth missing (living people)